Below is a listing of known academic programs that offer bachelor's degrees (B.S. or B.S.E. or B.E / B.Tech) in what ABET terms "Agricultural Engineering", "Biosystems Engineering", "Biological Engineering", or similarly named programs. ABET accredits college and university programs in the disciplines of applied science, computing, engineering, and engineering technology.

The Americas

North America

Mexico, Central and South America

Europe

Asia

Oceania

Africa

External links 
Bureau of Labor Statistics, Agricultural Engineering Education

 https://www.bls.gov/ooh/architecture-and-engineering/agricultural-engineers.htm#tab-4

Engineering education
Agricultural Engineering Departments